The  (German for "Rock at the Ring") and  ("Rock in the Park") festivals are two simultaneous rock music festivals held annually. While Rock am Ring takes place at the Nürburgring race track, Rock im Park takes place at the Zeppelinfeld in Nuremberg.

Sharing nearly identical lineups, the two festivals are usually regarded as one event. All artists perform one day at the Nürburgring and another day in Nürnberg during the three-day event. There have been minor exceptions in the past years where an artist would be announced for one of the festivals only. Combined, Rock im Park and Rock am Ring are the largest music festivals held in Germany and one of the largest in the world with a combined attendance of over 150,000 people in 2007, selling out both events in advance for the first time.

History

Rock am Ring was originally planned as a one-time festival on the Nürburgring motorsports complex, celebrating the inauguration of a newer, shorter version of the race track in 1985, but due to its commercial success (with 75,000 audience members), it was decided to make the concert an annual event. However, after a dip in attendance for the 1988 event, the festival was put on hiatus for two years. In 1991, the festival returned with a new concept: as well as featuring well-known artists, event organizers present lesser known up-and-coming bands to the public. In 1993, Rock im Park took place for the first time in Vienna. For the 1994 event, Rock im Park moved to the disused Munich-Riem airport, and the following year to Munich's Olympiastadion, where it found a home for the 1995 and 1996 event. In 1997 Rock im Park moved to Nuremberg's Frankenstadion where it was held until the venue was unavailable in 2004 because the stadium was being renovated for the 2006 Football World Cup. Since 2004 the venue moved again to the current Zeppellinfeld, where Rock im Park was since held with the exception of the 2006 festival, which was moved to the Luitpoldhain.

The 2007 festival was used in a science experiment to test the effects of large bodies of people simultaneously jumping. The experiment data was used to calculate the result if the entire Chinese population were to jump in unison. The experiment concluded no significant results would come from the theoretical event.

After 29 editions of Rock am Ring, the new owner of the Nürburgring decided that the contract would not be extended. The festival continued at another location in 2015 and 2016 (Mendig Air Base/Vulkaneifel), returning to the Nürburgring in 2017.

Venues

Past dates and headliners

2008 festival
The 2008 festival took place on 6–8 June 2008. 91 acts have been officially confirmed. Both festivals were sold out on 1 May.

Confirmed acts:

3 Doors Down (replacing Chris Cornell, who backed out to record an album), 36 Crazyfists, Against Me!, Airbourne, Alpha Galates, Alter Bridge, Animal Alpha, Babyshambles, Bad Religion, Bedouin Soundclash, The Black Dahlia Murder, Black Stone Cherry, Black Tide, Bloodlights, Booka Shade, Bullet for My Valentine, CSS, Cavalera Conspiracy, Chiodos, Coheed and Cambria, Culcha Candela, Danko Jones, Die Toten Hosen, Dimmu Borgir, Disco Ensemble, Disturbed, Eagles of Death Metal, EL*KE, Fair to Midland, Fettes Brot, Fiction Plane, Filter, Finger Eleven, From First to Last, Gavin DeGraw, Gavin Rossdale, High on Fire, HIM, Hot Chip, In Case of Fire, In Flames, Incubus, Infadels, Jimmy Eat World, Joe Lean & The Jing Jang Jong, Johnossi, Jonathan Davis, Justice, Kate Nash, Kid Rock, Kill Hannah, Lostprophets, Madsen, Manic Street Preachers, Masters of Reality, Metallica, Motörhead, Nightwish, Oomph!, Opeth, Paramore, Pete Murray, Queens of the Stone Age, Rafael Weber, Rage Against the Machine, Rival Schools, Róisín Murphy, Rooney, Rose Tattoo, Saul Williams, Saxon, Seether, Serj Tankian, Silverstein, Simple Plan, Söhne Mannheims, Sonic Syndicate, Sportfreunde Stiller, Stereophonics, Steriogram, Takida, The Fall of Troy, The Fratellis, The Futureheads, The Hellacopters, The Offspring, The Prodigy, The Streets, The Verve, Tokyo Police Club, Turisas and ZOX.

Glory of Joann's MySpace profile lists them as performing at Rock am Ring, and ringrocker lists them as officially confirmed.

2009 festival
The headling acts for 2009 were Limp Bizkit, Slipknot, The Prodigy, KoЯn, Marilyn Manson, The Killers, Placebo and Billy Talent. Other bands included 2raumwohnung, Alexisonfire, All That Remains, ...And You Will Know Us by the Trail of Dead, Basement Jaxx, Biffy Clyro, Black Stone Cherry, Bloc Party, Bring Me the Horizon, Chester French, Chris Cornell, Dir En Grey, DragonForce, Dredg, Enter Shikari, Esser, Expatriate, Five Finger Death Punch, Flogging Molly, Forbidden Theory, Gallows, Guano Apes, Hollywood Undead, Ich Bin Bunt, Jan Delay & Disko No. 1, Juliette Lewis, Kettcar, Kilians, Killswitch Engage, Kitty, Daisy & Lewis, Little Man Tate, Machine Head, Madina Lake, Madness, Mando Diao, M.I.A., Middle Class Rut, New Found Glory, Pain, Papa Roach, Peter Bjorn and John, Peter Fox, Phoenix, Polarkreis 18, Razorlight, Reamonn, Scouting for Girls, Selig, Sevendust, Shinedown, Staind, Steadlür, Sugarplum Fairy, The All-American Rejects, The Crave, The Gaslight Anthem, The Kooks, The Rifles, The Script, The Soundtrack of Our Lives (OEOC), The Subways, Tomte, Trivium, Volbeat, White Lies
Rock am Ring tickets were sold out by March 26.

2011 festival
The headliners for the 2011 festival were System of a Down, Coldplay. Other bands included Disturbed, Alter Bridge, Rob Zombie, Interpol, Avenged Sevenfold, Social Distortion, Volbeat, Beatsteaks, August Burns Red, The BossHoss, Hurts, KoЯn, Madsen, Mando Diao, The Kooks, Sevendust, In Flames, 3 Doors Down, Lifehouse, The Devil Wears Prada, Ash and The Gaslight Anthem.

2012 festival
Acts for the 2012 edition included As I Lay Dying, Anthrax, Awolnation, Billy Talent, Crystal Castles, Deichkind, DevilDriver, Dick Brave and the Backbeats, Die Toten Hosen, Donots, Enter Shikari, Evanescence, Example, Gossip, Gojira, Guano Apes, Kasabian, Keane, KoRn, The Koletzkis, Killswitch Engage, Lamb of God, Lexy & K-Paul, Linkin Park, Machine Head, Marilyn Manson, Metallica, MIA., Motörhead, The Offspring, Opeth, Periphery, Shinedown, Skrillex, Soundgarden, Tenacious D, The Subways, and Trivium.

2013 festival
2013's edition was sold out since the beginning of January, and included acts like Thirty Seconds to Mars, Green Day, The Prodigy, Fettes Brot, Volbeat, Stone Sour, Sportfreunde Stiller, Simple Plan, The Killers, Paramore, All Time Low, Fun., Imagine Dragons, Papa Roach, Korn, Limp Bizkit, Bullet for My Valentine, Amon Amarth, A Day to Remember, Bring Me the Horizon, Asking Alexandria, The Bosshoss, Airbourne, Bush, Hacktivist, The Bloody Beetroots, Hurts, Phoenix, Tocotronic, Biffy Clyro, Stereophonics, Kate Nash, Selig, Bosse, Kraftklub, Bad Religion, Royal Republic, Seeed, Casper, The Wombats, ASAP Rocky, Five Finger Death Punch, Coheed And Cambria, Coal Chamber, Escape the Fate, Newsted and Pierce the Veil

2014 festival
The 2014's edition of Rock am Ring was spread over 4 days.
Headliners: Iron Maiden, Kings of Leon, Linkin Park, Metallica . Other bands included Alligatoah, Alter Bridge, Avenged Sevenfold, Babyshambles, Booka Shade, Die Fantastischen Vier, Fall Out Boy, Ghost, Gogol Bordello, Heaven Shall Burn, In Extremo, Jake Bugg, Jan Delay & Disko No. 1, John Newman, Karnivool, Klangkarussell Live, Kvelertak, Left Boy, Mando Diao, Marteria, Mastodon, Maxïmo Park, Milky Chance, Nine Inch Nails, Of Mice & Men, Opeth, Portugal. The Man, Powerman 5000, Queens of the Stone Age, Rob Zombie, Rudimental, SDP, Sierra Kidd, Slayer, Suicide Silence, Teesy, Triggerfinger, The Offspring.

2015 festival
In 2015 the festival moved to a new location, Mendig Air Base 
Headliners: Foo Fighters, Die Toten Hosen, Slipknot, Motionless in White. Other bands included A Day to Remember, Asking Alexandria, Bad Religion, Bastille, Body Count Feat. Ice-T, Eagles of Death Metal, Enter Shikari, Godsmack, Hollywood Undead, In Flames, Interpol, Lamb of God, Marilyn Manson, Motörhead, Papa Roach, Parkway Drive, Pop Evil, Rise Against, Royal Republic, Skindred, Slash, Three Days Grace, Yellowcard and Zebrahead.

2016 festival
The festival was cancelled during the second day due to severe thunderstorms.

2017 festival
In 2017 the festival returned to the Nürburgring.
Headliners: Rammstein, Die Toten Hosen and System of a Down.

On the evening of 2 June 2017, the first day of the festival, the sold-out event with about 85,000 visitors was interrupted at 9:00 pm during a performance by the Düsseldorf band Broilers and the festival grounds cleared. The reason given was a terrorist situation. Other scheduled performances for Friday evening, including those of the headliner Rammstein and the rapper Marteria, were cancelled. Three men were arrested and checked in Hesse that same evening. Two of the men assigned to the Salafist scene in Hesse had access rights in the form of bracelets, which gave them direct access to many festival areas. One of the men was also suspected of having links to the terrorist scene. However, on the morning of 3 June, after a search of the grounds and a raid of the suspect's homes, the police announced that the suspicion of a threatening attack had not been substantiated, so that the festival could continue on Saturday noon. The access rights to the festival site had been received by the two main suspects due to a short-term staffing request from an external security service provider.

2018 festival
The 2018 festival took place again in Nürburgring. Headliners: Thirty Seconds to Mars, Muse, Foo Fighters, Avenged Sevenfold, Marilyn Manson, and Gorillaz.

2019 festival
The 2019 festival took place once again in Nürburgring. Headliners: Tool, Slipknot, Die Ärzte, and Slayer. Out of the 77 artists in the lineup, 36 percent were rock bands, equally representing alternative rock, hard rock, and indie rock, and 29 percent were metal bands.

2020 festival 
On April 16, 2020, the 2020 festival was cancelled due to the COVID-19 pandemic.

2021 festival 
On March 10, 2021, the 2021 festival was once more cancelled due to the COVID-19 pandemic.

2022 festival 
The festival resumed after being cancelled 2 years in a row due to the COVID-19 pandemic. The festival took place from June 3, thru June 5, 2022. The festivals headliners were Green Day, Muse, Deftones, Volbeat, Billy Talent, Korn, Weezer, The Offspring, Mastodon, and The Distillers.

Gallery

References

External links 

 Official Rock am Ring site
 Official Rock im Park site
 Ringrocker.com
 Parkrocker.net
 Rockpalast – Rock am Ring 2007
 Rock am Ring live sets audio files archive, Rockpalast broadcast

Heavy metal festivals in Germany
Concert tours
Music festivals established in 1985
1985 establishments in Germany